Identity token may refer to:

 Security token
 Windows NT architecture
 Session token